Anita Doth (born 28 December 1971) is a Dutch singer and songwriter best known as the former singer of the duo 2 Unlimited, along with rapper Ray Slijngaard.

Personal life
Anita Daniëlle Dels was born in Amsterdam to a Surinamese father, Rolf Dels, and a Dutch mother, Lydia. In 1991 she finished her education and landed her first job in an administrative position at a police station. She has one son.

On 11 January 2010, it was announced that Doth was being treated for breast cancer, undergoing chemotherapy. Doth continued to perform with Ray as much as possible under her treatment regimen. In 2011, Doth was declared breast-cancer-free.

On 8 November 2013, Doth announced via Twitter that 2 Unlimited would soon be taking a break until April 2014 as she was pregnant. The new arrival was expected in February 2014.

Music career

2 Unlimited (1991–1996)
2 Unlimited is a Eurodance project founded in 1991 by two Belgian producers Jean-Paul DeCoster and Phil Wilde and fronted by Dutch rapper Ray Slijngaard and Anita Doth.

In the early 1990s, Slijngaard had been asked to write rap lyrics for a tune written by de Coster and Wilde. He also wrote a chorus to be sung by a female vocalist, for which he asked Doth to sing the lyrics. The demo was presented to de Coster and Wilde, leading to Doth joining 2 Unlimited, and "Get Ready for This" was produced as their first single.

Doth sang the choruses for the majority of their songs; however there were some B sides, and one successful single, "Nothing Like the Rain", where she sang close to all the lyrics. The band became an instant success in Europe and throughout the world. Their hits included "Maximum Overdrive", "No Limit", "Tribal Dance", "The Real Thing", "Twilight Zone" and "Workaholic". After sixteen music videos, forty-five songs, and four albums, the group split up in 1996.

After 2 Unlimited (1996–2009)
After 2 Unlimited broke up in 1996, Doth became a presenter on Dutch music television station TMF (The Music Factory), hosting Welcome to the Pleasure Zone, a show featuring both music videos and live performances. She also worked as a DJ on Dutch radio station Radio 538. Later that year, she sang a duet with popular Dutch singer René Froger titled "That's When I'll Stop Loving You".

In 2000, she released her solo album, Reality. Among the singles taken from the album were "Universe", "Lifting up My Life", and "This Is Reality". Doth worked with producers Todd Terry and Steve Mac, among others.

In 2002, Doth formed Divas of Dance with Linda Estelle (formerly of T-Spoon) and Desiree "Des'Ray" Manders (formerly of 2 Brothers on the 4th Floor). They performed a variety of disco and dance classics, including the biggest hits from each of their respective bands. In 2006, Divas of Dance released a single entitled "Falling into the Groove".

During the later 2000s, Doth toured the UK as part of the 90s Reloaded Adult Weekenders at Butlin's. Billed as "Anita Doth from 2 Unlimited", the performance would include the biggest hits of 2 Unlimited from the 1990s.

2 Unlimited Comeback (2009–2016)
Doth & her former 2 Unlimited colleague, Ray Slijngaard, reunited on 11 April 2009, to perform together for the first time in 13 years at the "I love the 90s" concert in Hasselt, Belgium. Further gigs followed on 30 April at the Radio 538 Queen's Day concert at Museumplein in Amsterdam, and as support act for Milk Inc. at the Sportpaleis in Antwerp on 25 September.

Performing under the name Ray & Anita, it was confirmed on 29 December that the duo would release a new single together in 2010 titled "In Da Name Of Love". Jean-Paul de Coster is thought to have denied permission for them to use the name "2 Unlimited", as he still owns the rights to the brand.

On 11 July 2012, it was announced that Slijngaard and Doth would be working again with the Belgian producer, de Coster under the name 2 Unlimited.

Departure from 2 Unlimited (2016–)
On 20 April 2016, 2 Unlimited announced that Doth would be leaving the band to embark on a solo career. On 13 August, Kim Vergouwen was announced as Doth's replacement in 2 Unlimited.

Discography

Studio albums

Singles as lead artist

Singles as featured artist

References

External links

2 Unlimited Official Website

1971 births
Living people
Dutch keyboardists
Dutch police officers
Dutch people of Surinamese descent
Eurodance musicians
Musicians from Amsterdam
21st-century Dutch singers
21st-century Dutch women singers